Russia–Belarus energy dispute may refer to:

2004 Russia–Belarus gas dispute
2007 Russia–Belarus energy dispute